Puri Zila School is a government high school and one of the oldest school in Odisha, India. It was established in 1853 in the holy city of Puri, located in Kundheibenta Sahi. The school moved to another building which later converted to Samanta Chandra Sekhara College, Puri. Puri Zila School moved to its current location on Station Road in 1958.

It imparts teaching in humanities, social sciences, physical sciences etc. The school has indoor and outdoor games and sports facilities. Other societies and activities are NCC, Red Cross, Scouts and Guides.

Noted alumni
 Nirmal Kumar Bose, anthropologist
 Gopabandhu Das, Freedom Fighter
 Madhab Chandra Dash, Environmentalist 
 Kalindi Charan Panigrahi, poet
 Sachidananda Routray, poet

See also
 Board of Secondary Education, Odisha
 Badagada Government High School, Bhubaneswar
 Capital High School, Bhubaneswar
 Secondary Board High School

Gallery

References

Schools in Odisha
Puri
1853 establishments in India
Educational institutions established in 1853